The 2017–18 Cincinnati Bearcats men's basketball team represented the University of Cincinnati in the 2017–18 NCAA Division I men's basketball season. The team played its home games at the BB&T Arena on the campus of Northern Kentucky University in Highland Heights, Kentucky due to renovations at their home arena, Fifth Third Arena. The Bearcats were led by 12th-year head coach Mick Cronin and are members of the American Athletic Conference. They finished the season 31–5, 16–2 in AAC play to win the regular season championship. They defeated SMU, Memphis, and Houston to win the AAC tournament and received the conference's automatic bid to the NCAA tournament. As the No. 2 seed in the South region, they defeated Georgia State in the First Round before being upset by Nevada in the Second Round. In their loss to Nevada, they were up 22 before losing 75-73, tying the second largest comeback in terms of deficit in NCAA Tournament history, the other being in the 2001 Final Four where 3 seed Maryland was up 22 to eventual champion and former ACC rival Duke before losing 95-84. The largest was in the 2012 first four when 14 seed Iona was up 25 to BYU before losing 78-72. However both these teams had their leads in the first half whereas Cincinnati was up 22 with 11:34 to go, making their collapse arguably the most shocking.

Previous season
The Bearcats finished the 2016–17 season 30–6, 16–2 to finish in second place in AAC play. They beat Tulsa and UConn in the AAC tournament before losing to SMU in the championship game. The Bearcats received an at-large bid to the NCAA tournament as the No. 6 seed in the South region. In the NCAA Tournament, they defeated No. 11 Kansas State in the First Round 75–61 before losing to No. 3 UCLA 79–67 in the Second Round.

Offseason

Departing players

Recruiting class of 2017

Cincinnati will also add Preferred Walk-on Sam Martin a 5'10" PG from Summit Country Day School in Cincinnati, Ohio.

Preseason
At the conference's annual media day, the Bearcats were narrowly picked to win the AAC receiving seven of the 12 first-place votes. Gary Clark, Jacob Evans, and Kyle Washington were named to the preseason All-AAC second team.

Roster

Depth chart

Source

Schedule and results

|-
!colspan=9 style=| Exhibition

|-
!colspan=9 style=| Non-conference regular season
|-

|-
!colspan=12 style=| AAC Regular Season

|-
!colspan=12 style=| AAC Tournament
|-

|-
!colspan=12 style=| NCAA tournament
|-

Source

Awards and milestones

All-American
Honorable Mention: Gary Clark

American Athletic Conference honors

All-AAC Awards
Player of the Year: Gary Clark
Defensive Player of the Year: Gary Clark
Sportsmanship Award: Gary Clark

All-AAC First Team
Gary Clark
Jacob Evans

All-AAC Honorable Mention
Kyle Washington

Player of the Week
Week 3: Gary Clark
Week 6: Jacob Evans
Week 9: Jacob Evans
Week 11: Gary Clark
Week 12: Gary Clark

Weekly Honor Roll
Week 2: Jarron Cumberland
Week 6: Gary Clark
Week 8: Jarron Cumberland
Week 10: Jarron Cumberland
Week 13: Jacob Evans
Week 14: Kyle Washington
Week 16: Gary Clark
Week 17: Jacob Evans

Rankings

*AP does not release post-NCAA tournament rankings

References

Cincinnati
Cincinnati Bearcats men's basketball seasons
Cincinnati
Cincinnati Bearcats men's basketball
Cincinnati Bearcats men's basketball